Pancoast is a surname. Notable people with the surname include:

 Fred Pancoast (born c. 1932), human resources executive and former American football player and coach
 G. Sieber Pancoast (1914–1992), former Republican member of the Pennsylvania House of Representatives
 Henry Pancoast (1875–1939), American radiologist after whom a type of lung tumor is named (Pancoast tumor)
 Joseph Pancoast (1805–1882), American surgeon

See also
 Pancoast, Pennsylvania
 Pancoast Creek, tributary of the Lackawanna River in Pennsylvania, United States
 Pancoast Pelican, American twin-engine aircraft
 Pancoast tumor, also called a pulmonary sulcus tumor or superior sulcus tumor, tumor of the pulmonary apex